Rascal Flatts was an American country music band founded in 1999. The band consisted of Gary LeVox (lead vocals), Jay DeMarcus (bass guitar, background vocals), and Joe Don Rooney (lead guitar, background vocals). DeMarcus is LeVox's second cousin, a brother-in-law of country music singer James Otto, and a former member of the contemporary Christian music duo East to West.

From 2000 to 2010, they recorded for Disney Music Group's former Lyric Street Records division. While on that label, they released six studio albums, all of which have been certified platinum or higher by the Recording Industry Association of America (RIAA). In order of release, they are Rascal Flatts (2000), Melt (2002), Feels Like Today (2004), Me and My Gang (2006), Still Feels Good (2007), and Unstoppable (2009). After Lyric Street closed in 2010, they moved to Big Machine Records for five more studio albums: Nothing Like This (2010), Changed (2012), Rewind (2014), The Greatest Gift of All (2016), and their final studio album, Back to Us (2017).

Rascal Flatts released more than forty singles, sixteen of which reached number one on the Billboard Hot Country Songs, Country Airplay, and/or Canada Country charts. Their longest-lasting number-one single, a cover of Marcus Hummon's "Bless the Broken Road", spent five weeks in that position in 2005. Through 2006–07, "What Hurts the Most" was number one on both the Hot Country Songs and Adult Contemporary charts, and garnered their highest peak on the Billboard Hot 100 at number six. The band also had commercial success with a cover of Tom Cochrane's "Life Is a Highway", which they recorded for the soundtrack of the Pixar animated film Cars (2006). Their music is defined by country pop influences, as well as their distinct vocal harmonies. In addition to their own music, DeMarcus has produced albums for Chicago, Jennette McCurdy, and Brooks & Dunn member Kix Brooks.

On January 7, 2020, Rascal Flatts announced that they would be disbanding following a farewell tour after 22 years together. However, this farewell tour was canceled due to the COVID-19 pandemic; the group's disbandment was not officially confirmed until October 2021.

History 

Rascal Flatts' founding was at Fiddle and Steel Guitar Bar in Nashville, Tennessee. Gary LeVox and Jay DeMarcus are second cousins from a musical family. DeMarcus moved to Nashville in 1992, earning his first record deal as part of a Christian group called East to West; his brother-in-law, James Otto, is also a country music singer. In 1997, DeMarcus called LeVox, and convinced him to come to Nashville and provide some harmonies on Michael English's album Gospel, which he was producing. They engineered the album together, and became English's backup band.

At the same time, DeMarcus had become the bandleader of Chely Wright's band, where he met Joe Don Rooney, the guitarist in that band. DeMarcus and LeVox were working in a Printer's Alley nightclub, and when their part-time guitarist could not make it one night, DeMarcus invited Rooney to join them. Jim Riley was the drummer and bandleader for the band. The group covered the hit Shenandoah single "The Church on Cumberland Road" that night. To the group's recollection, a bond was formed instantly.

Singer Mila Mason recommended the group to record producers Mark Bright and Marty Williams, who played Lyric Street Records A&R Doug Howard a three-song demo and Howard thought they were "just incredible." After he'd heard the demos, the band went into the Lyric Street offices the next day, sat down with acoustic guitars, and played a couple of songs. According to Howard in an interview with HitQuarters: "The vocals and harmonies, it was all there—I was just blown away. The lead singer has such a unique and compelling voice." The band was signed to Lyric Street in late 1999.

Career

2000–2005: Rascal Flatts, Melt, and Feels Like Today 
In early 2000, the group made its debut with the single "Prayin' for Daylight". This song had been on the three-song demo that had gotten the band signed. The song, which reached No. 3 on the Billboard country charts, was the first single from their self-titled debut, which was issued in early 2000 on Lyric Street. Following "Prayin' for Daylight", the album's other three singles all made the Top 10 on that chart with "This Everyday Love", "While You Loved Me", and "I'm Movin' On", which respectively peaked at numbers 9, 7, and 4. "I'm Movin' On" was awarded Song of the Year by the Academy of Country Music in 2002. Stephen Thomas Erlewine reviewed the album with favor, calling it "a sunny, pleasing modern country-pop album".

Their second album, entitled Melt, was released in 2002. Unlike their previous album, Melt was co-produced by the band. The album's first single, "These Days", became the band's first number one hit on the U.S. country charts. The album included two more Top 10 hits with "Love You Out Loud" "I Melt", and "Mayberry". The latter became the band's second number one. The music video for "I Melt" featured partial nudity and was banned from the Great American Country network.

Rascal Flatts' third album, Feels Like Today, was released in late 2004. The album's title track was released as its first single. Following it was "Bless the Broken Road". The song was originally recorded by its co-writer, Marcus Hummon, and had also been recorded by Melodie Crittenden (whose version made the country chart in 1998), the Nitty Gritty Dirt Band, and Sons of the Desert. In early 2005, Rascal Flatts's version became the band's third number one hit on the U.S. country charts and spent five weeks at that position. The third single, "Fast Cars and Freedom", hit number one as well. While the latter was climbing the charts, some radio stations began playing a hidden track on the album, titled "Skin". This airplay caused "Skin" to enter the top 40. The song was released as a single under the title "Skin (Sarabeth)" and officially added to the album's track list.

2005–2007: Me and My Gang and Still Feels Good 

Rascal Flatts's thirteenth chart entry, "What Hurts the Most", was released in December 2005. This song had previously been recorded by Mark Wills in 2003. Rascal Flatts' version of that song was released as the first single from their fourth album Me and My Gang, which was released in 2006. For this album, the band worked with producer Dann Huff. They switched producers to create a more band-oriented album. Rascal Flatts' rendition of "What Hurts the Most" was a crossover hit for the band, reaching No. 1 on both the country and adult contemporary charts, as well as peaking with the top 10 on the Billboard Hot 100. After it, the album's title track was released as the second single and charted in the Top 10 at number 6. The third and fourth singles, "My Wish" and "Stand", both reached number one.

Also in 2006, the group charted in the top 10 of the Hot 100 with a cover of Tom Cochrane's "Life Is a Highway", which they recorded for the Pixar film Cars. Although "Life Is a Highway" was not released to country radio, several country stations did begin playing the song, causing it to chart within the top 20 of Hot Country Songs. Me and My Gang had the highest US debut of 2006, with 722,000 units in April. The album spent 15 weeks at No. 1 on the Billboard Top Country Albums chart and was the second-best selling album of 2006 (behind High School Musical), with sales totaling to about 3.5 million by year's end. The album's success led the band to take the spot of top-selling artist for all genres of music, which had not been accomplished in 15 years by a country group.

Carrie Underwood and Rascal Flatts performed together at the 2007 Grammy Awards ceremony. Later the same year, the group released the single "Take Me There", a song which Kenny Chesney co-wrote and had initially planned to record himself. That song became a number-one country hit in September and served as the first single from the album Still Feels Good. It was followed by "Winner at a Losing Game", which was the first single which the band wrote themselves. Both it and its followup "Every Day" peaked at No. 2 on the country charts. The fourth single from the album, "Bob That Head", became the band's first single to miss the Top 10 on the chart. The fifth and final single, "Here", was released in August 2008 and became the band's ninth Number One hit on the chart week of January 3, 2009.

2008–2010: Greatest Hits Volume 1 and Unstoppable 
Rascal Flatts released their first compilation album, Greatest Hits Volume 1, on October 28, 2008. The album contains 13 of their biggest songs, starting with "Prayin' for Daylight" and going through "Life Is a Highway". The limited edition of the album contains a second disc with three Christmas songs: "White Christmas", "Jingle Bell Rock", and "I'll Be Home for Christmas". A year later in October 2009, they released a second edition of their greatest hits collection, this time with a second disc containing live performances of "Take Me There", "Summer Nights", "Me & My Gang", and "Winner at a Losing Game".

In January 2009, Rascal Flatts released the song "Here Comes Goodbye" as the first single from the album Unstoppable, which was released on April 7 of that year. Co-written by American Idol season six finalist Chris Sligh, "Here Comes Goodbye" became the group's tenth number one hit. The second single form the Unstoppable album, "Summer Nights", which was co-written by Gary LeVox, was released in early May 2009. That song debuted at No. 57 and topped out at No. 2 on the country charts. The group performed "Summer Nights" at the CMT Music Awards, Oprahs Kickoff Party, and the finale of America's Got Talent. The third single off the album, "Why", peaked at No. 18 on the country charts. Rascal Flatts performed that song on The Tonight Show with Conan O'Brien. The title track was released as the album's fourth single in January 2010.

A special release version of their album Unstoppable was sold at JCPenney stores nationwide.  It features a special release song entitled "American Living" only available on the albums sold at JCPenney stores.  JCPenney is an official sponsor of Rascal Flatts' Unstoppable American Living Tour in a two-year partnership and $1 of every CD sold at JCPenney will be donated to the JCPenney Afterschool Fund.  On July 16, 2009, as part of the JCPenney American Living Tour, Rascal Flatts made history as the first country music group to play Chicago's Wrigley Field.  The trio was joined by fellow artists Vince Gill and Darius Rucker for a near-sellout crowd.

2010–2011: Nothing Like This and The Best of Rascal Flatts Live 
After the closure of Lyric Street in April 2010, Rascal Flatts signed to Big Machine Records in July of that year. The group's first single from the label was the song "Why Wait". The song was the first single from the album Nothing Like This, which was released November 16, 2010. In December 2010, "Why Wait" became the trio's eleventh number one hit on the U.S. country charts.

In March 2011, Rascal Flatts was featured on a remix of Justin Bieber's song "That Should Be Me". The second single from Nothing Like This was "I Won't Let Go". That song went to number 2 in early 2011. Following it was the band's first collaborative release to country radio, "Easy", which is a duet with British pop singer Natasha Bedingfield. "I Won't Let Go", and "Easy" peaked at numbers 2 and 3 respectively on the country charts. On November 8, 2011, Hollywood Records released The Best of Rascal Flatts Live.

2012–2013: Changed 
Rascal Flatts' eighth studio album, Changed, was released on April 3, 2012. It was produced by Dann Huff and Rascal Flatts. The first single from that album, "Banjo", became their twelfth number one on the country charts. The second single off the album, "Come Wake Me Up", reached the top five on the Country Airplay chart. The third single from the album is the title track.

Band member Jay DeMarcus and his wife, CMT Insider correspondent Allison Alderson DeMarcus, welcomed the arrival of their second child, Dylan Jay DeMarcus, on July 20 in Nashville.

Rascal Flatts received the 2,480th star in the category of recording of the Hollywood Walk of Fame on September 17, 2012. The star is located in front of the Sergeant Supply Store at 6664 Hollywood Boulevard. They became the second country artist with Oklahoma ties to receive a star on the Hollywood Walk of Fame that month after Vince Gill received his star the previous week.

On November 19, Rascal Flatts released their second DVD, All Access & Uncovered: The Making of Changed and Beyond, inviting the public into their inner circle. The DVD project reveals a more intimate side of Gary LeVox, Joe Don Rooney and Jay DeMarcus' lives during the making of their Changed album and more. The project made a one-night-only debut in movie theaters across the country in conjunction with the album release earlier that year, with the band celebrating with fans at the AMC Theater in New York City's Times Square. On November 20, the band made a guest appearance on NBC's The Voice to promote their new DVD. They performed "Changed" with Cody Belew and Cassadee Pope, contestants from the show.

In December 2012, Rascal Flatts and Nashville actress Hayden Panettiere hosted the third annual 2012 CMT Artists of the Year to honor the top country acts of the year. Rascal Flatts also hosted The 14th Annual A Home for the Holidays with Rascal Flatts. The show earned a 4.91(million) rating.

Rascal Flatts and Journey headlined the Super Bowl XLVII CMT Crossroads concert at the New Orleans Sugar Mill on February 2, 2013. This marked the second collaboration for Rascal Flatts and Journey. In June 2012, Rascal Flatts closed the CMT Music Awards by inviting Journey to perform their hit "Don't Stop Believin'" with them on stage. Rascal Flatts was nominated for International Artist of the Year and International Music Video of the Year (for "Banjo" and "Come Wake Me Up") at the 2013 CMC Music Awards.

2013–2016: Rewind and The Greatest Gift of All 
On April 8, 2013, Jay DeMarcus tweeted that Rascal Flatts was working on a new album The lead single, "Rewind", was issued in January 2014 from the album of the same name, which was released on May 13, 2014. The band admitted they were lip-syncing to a recording of "Rewind" during the Academy of Country Music (ACM) Awards on April 6, 2014. In response to the controversy, Rascal Flatts communicated afterwards that LeVox had lost his voice and so they made a last-minute decision to lip-sync. "Rewind" became a Top 5 hit on the Country Airplay chart in 2014. Rewind produced three more singles with "Payback", which peaked at 21, "Riot", which reached 20, and "I Like the Sound of That", which was released to country radio on September 14, 2015. The latter song, co-written by Shay Mooney of Dan + Shay and pop musician Meghan Trainor, reached number 1 on the Country Airplay chart in April 2016. That year, Rascal Flatts were selected as one of 30 artists to perform on "Forever Country", a mash-up track of "Take Me Home, Country Roads", "On the Road Again" and "I Will Always Love You" which celebrates 50 years of the CMA Awards. The band released a Christmas album entitled The Greatest Gift of All in October 2016.

2017–2020: Back to Us, announced breakup, cancelled farewell tour, How They Remember You EP and second greatest hits package 
Rascal Flatts' next single, "Yours If You Want It", was released to country radio in early 2017. The track served as the lead single from their tenth studio album Back to Us, which was released on May 19 of the same year. It topped the Country Airplay charts in August 2017, marking the band's fourteenth number one on the chart. On September 28, 2018, Rascal Flatts released a new single titled "Back to Life". The band embarked on their Summer Playlist tour in summer 2019.

On January 7, 2020, Rascal Flatts appeared on CBS This Morning to announce a farewell tour, the "Rascal Flatts: Life Is a Highway Tour" to celebrate their twentieth anniversary. They also promised new music. On February 25, Gary LeVox posted on Instagram that the band was working on a new album. On May 1, the band released a cover of "Through the Years" as a tribute to the late Kenny Rogers. On May 19, the group announced on social media that their farewell tour had been indefinitely postponed amidst the COVID-19 pandemic in the United States. The band released a new single entitled "How They Remember You" on June 19. It appears on an EP of the same name, released on July 31. On September 18, the band announced a new greatest hits package, Twenty Years of Rascal Flatts: The Greatest Hits, released on October 2.

In November 2020, the band was forced to cancel their performance at the 54th Annual CMA Awards after one of its members tested positive for COVID-19. However, it was not specified which member.

2021-present: Confirmed breakup and solo projects 

Gary LeVox released a Christmas song entitled "Christmas Will Be Different This Year" on November 13, 2020 and bassist Jay DeMarcus released a song entitled "Music Man" on January 29, 2021, as a tribute to his late father. LeVox released a Christian single entitled "The Distance" on March 19, 2021. In an interview for Billboard, LeVox revealed that Rascal Flatts would not tour at any point in 2021.

On April 27, 2021, DeMarcus stated in an interview with Taste of Country that the pandemic may have altered the band's plans for a farewell tour, and that they may stay together and perform 10-15 concerts annually. In July 2021, DeMarcus and Rooney attended the American Century Championship together. When asked if the band had broken up, Rooney said; "No, we’re never going to be done. No way. For us now, we are just recalibrating things, taking some time off and waiting for things to open up the next couple of years. We have no set year yet even, but at some point we’ll get back at it." DeMarcus himself said; "Rascal Flatts is bigger than the three of us. The time will come when we pass the torch. But first we have some unfinished business."

DeMarcus and Rooney appeared at the 2021 Academy of Country Music Honors show on August 25 to receive the Cliffie Stone Icon Award on behalf of the group, though LeVox was not present; DeMarcus and Rooney did not mention him or address his absence. In October, LeVox revealed that the band decided to break up officially, citing that Rooney had quit the band. LeVox also revealed he had not spoken to Rooney since his DUI arrest on September 10 and that the band quietly disbanded after the cancellation of their farewell tour.

In 2020, DeMarcus formed a new band called Generation Radio alongside ex-Chicago vocalist Jason Scheff, Journey drummer Deen Castronovo, Scott Rodriguez and former Rascal Flatts live instrumenalist Tom Yankton. Their eponymous debut album, released on August 12, 2022, features a new rendition of Rascal Flatts' song "All Night to Get There," with DeMarcus on lead vocals.

LeVox released a new single titled "Get Down Like That" on August 19, 2022.

Philanthropy and impact 
Rascal Flatts helped support music education in disadvantaged U.S. public schools by filming a PSA with Little Kids Rock. Through their encouragement for music education, giving the gift of "music" is possible in children's lives.

The band supported charities such as the Make A Wish Foundation. They helped raise one million dollars for the Central Ohio foundation. The event was Ohio State University's second annual "Big Wish Gala". Their chart-topping song, "My Wish" is also used on ESPN as the soundtrack for its series that follows the Make-a-Wish Foundation as they turn dreams into reality for children with life-threatening illnesses.

Since then, they have also contributed countable hours of their time—and $4 million—to Monroe Carell Jr. Children's Hospital at Vanderbilt which is among the nation's leading pediatric facilities, where the Rascal Flatts Pediatric Surgery Center was named in recognition of the trio's long-standing involvement.

Reception 
The group has an uncommon youth demographic (18–25) for country music. In September 2007, Weekly Reader Research conducted a poll of more than 2,000 children and Rascal Flatts ranked as the sixth-most-popular act among ages 10–12.

They have raised and donated millions of dollars to the Monroe Carell Jr. Children's Hospital at Vanderbilt. They were also involved with the American Red Cross as members on the celebrity cabinet board.

Touring 
Rascal Flatts enjoyed financial success as touring artists. Nielsen reported that the band was the top selling artist in 2006: "Rascal Flatts was the biggest selling artist, with nearly 5 million physical album sales and nearly 4 million digital track sales." They had their first headlining tour beginning in Fall 2002, and by 2005 they were among the top 25 tours of the year, grossing $26.3 million in 777,384 tickets sold, according to Billboard Boxscore. Their follow-up tour in 2006 grossed $46.2 million, drawing more than a million people to 79 shows.  Rascal Flatts had the third-highest US country tour in 2007, grossing $34 million from 588,009 tickets sold. The group grossed $16.8 million from their summer tour.

Rascal Flatts' shows were heavy on special effects, including videos, pyrotechnics and laser lights.

In 2013, Rascal Flatts headed to Australia for the first time to headline CMC Rocks The Hunter 2013, which was a three-day festival from March 15 to 17. They closed the proceedings.

Between 2004 and 2012, Rascal Flatts sold over 7 million tickets, making them one of the top selling music acts in that time.

In 2012, Rascal Flatts began the year with their "Thaw Out 2012" tour adding 47 additional dates on the Farmers Insurance Presents "Changed Tour" to bring the 2012 year-end total to just over 60 concerts and 1 million fans attending shows in the year alone.

On April 9, 2013, the group announced that they would co-headline a show with Journey on August 1 at Hersheypark Stadium with The Band Perry and Cassadee Pope as openers.

In 2016, Rascal Flatts celebrated a career milestone of 10 million tickets sold.

As of 2020, Rascal Flatts had sold over 11 million concert tickets.

Tours 
Headlining
2002–03: CMT Most Wanted Live/I Melt Tour
2004–05: Here's to You Tour
2006–07: Me & My Gang Tour
2007–08: Still Feels Good Tour
2008–09: Bob That Head Tour
2009–10: American Living Unstoppable Tour
2010–11: Nothing Like This Tour
2011: Flatts Fest Tour
2012: Thaw Out 2012 Tour
2012–13: Changed Tour
2013: Live & Loud Tour
2014: Rewind Tour
2015: Riot Tour
2016: Rhythm and Roots Tour
2018: Back To Us Tour
2019: Summer Playlist Tour
2020: Rascal Flatts Farewell – Life Is a Highway Tour (cancelled)

Supporting
2000–01: Burn Tour 
2002: Alan Jackson's Drive Tour 
2003: Neon Circus & Wild West Show 
2004: Guitars, Tiki Bars & Whole Lotta Love Tour

Contributions for other artists 
Rascal Flatts' members have also contributed to the work of other artists.

In 2006 they provided backing vocals on the song 'Love Will Come Back' by Chicago, from the album Chicago XXX. The album was produced by Jay DeMarcus.

LeVox, along with Jason Sellers and Wendell Mobley, co-wrote Phil Stacey's 2008 debut single "If You Didn't Love Me".

DeMarcus has co-produced albums for several artists, including Chely Wright's 2002 album Never Love You Enough, Chicago's Chicago XXX, and James Otto's 2008 album Sunset Man, the last of which had John Rich of Big & Rich as a co-producer. He also produced New to This Town, the first solo album released by Kix Brooks following his split from Brooks & Dunn,

The group has also contributed portions of the Hannah Montana: The Movie soundtrack, with acoustic versions of "Bless the Broken Road" and "Backwards".

In 2011, they did a remix of "That Should Be Me" by Justin Bieber on his remix album Never Say Never – The Remixes.

In the same year, Anna Wilson's Countrypolitan Duets album also included a song featuring Rascal Flatts and Ray Price, "You're the Best Thing That Ever Happened to Me".

Also in 2011, the band collaborated with Michael Bolton on his album Gems, on the song "Love Is Everything".

In 2012, Lionel Richie featured Rascal Flatts on his duet album, Tuskegee, on the song "Dancing on the Ceiling".

Also in 2012, Swedish country pop singer Jill Johnson featured Rascal Flatts on her album A Woman Can Change Her Mind, on a cover of their single "Come Wake Me Up".

The band appears on the track "Until Grace" by Tauren Wells, on his second studio album Citizen of Heaven.

Discography

Studio albums
Rascal Flatts (2000)
Melt (2002)
Feels Like Today (2004)
Me and My Gang (2006)
Still Feels Good (2007)
Unstoppable (2009)
Nothing Like This (2010)
Changed (2012)
Rewind (2014)
Back to Us (2017)

Awards 

2000
ACM Top New Vocal Duo Or Group (presented 2001)

2002
CMA Horizon Award
ACM Song of the Year ("I'm Movin' On") (presented 2003)
ACM Top Vocal Group (presented 2003)

2003
CMT Flameworthy Video Music Award for Group/Duo of the Year ("These Days")
CMA Vocal Group of the Year
ACM Top Vocal Group (presented 2004)

2004
CMT Flameworthy Music Video Award for Group/Duo of the Year ("I Melt")
CMA Vocal Group
ACM Top Vocal Group (presented 2005)

2005
CMT Music Award for Group/Duo of the Year ("Feels Like Today")
CMA Vocal Group of the Year
ACM Top Vocal Group (presented 2006)
Radio Music Awards for Song of the Year/Country Radio ("Bless The Broken Road")
Billboard Roadworks '05 Touring Awards for Breakthrough Act
Grammy for Best Country Performance by a Duo or Group with Vocal ("Bless the Broken Road")

2006
CMT Music Award for Group/Duo of the Year ("Skin (Sarabeth)")
CMA Vocal Group of the Year
AMA Favorite Country Band, Duo or Group
AMA T-Mobile Text-In Award
People's Choice Awards Favorite Song from a Movie ("Life Is A Highway")
People's Choice Awards Favorite Song Remake ("Life Is A Highway")
CMT Loaded Awards – Number One Digitally Active Group/Duo
CMT Loaded Awards – Number One Streamed Music Video ("What Hurts the Most")
Grammy Nomination: Best Country Performance by a Duo or Group with Vocal ("What Hurts The Most")

2007
CMT Music Awards for Group Video of the Year ("What Hurts the Most")
ACM Top Vocal Group (presented 2008)
CMA Vocal Group of the Year
AMA Favorite Country Band, Duo or Group
BMI Song of The Year ("What Hurts The Most")

2008
People's Choice Awards Favorite Country Song ("Stand")
CMT Music Award for Group Video of the Year ("Take Me There")
ACM Top Vocal Group (presented 2009)
ACM Humanitarian Award
CMA Vocal Group of the Year
AMA Favorite Country Band, Duo or Group
Grammy Nomination: Best Country Performance by a Duo or Group with Vocal ("Every Day")

2009
People's Choice Awards Favorite Group
CMT Music Award for Group Video of the Year ("Every Day")
AMA Favorite Country Band, Duo or Group
Grammy Nomination: Best Country Performance by a Duo or Group with Vocal ("Here Comes Goodbye")

2010
Star on the Music City Walk of Fame
ACA Decade Artist award

2011
Tony Martell Lifetime Entertainment Achievement Award
CMT Music Award for Collaborative Video of the Year ("That Should Be Me")
Member of the Grand Ole Opry

2012
CRS 2012 Artist Humanitarian Award
Star on the Hollywood Walk of Fame

2013
ACM Jim Reeves International Award (presented 2014)

2021
CRS Artist Career Achievement Award
ACM Cliffie Stone Icon Award

Film and television appearances 
Rascal Flatts, along with David Hartley, contributed "Walk The Llama Llama" to the sound track of The Emperor's New Groove.
In addition to Tom Cochrane's "Life Is a Highway," the group covered The Beatles' hit "Revolution" for Evan Almighty. Their version of the song did not appear on the soundtrack.

Rascal Flatts appear as themselves in "The Limo" episode of Yes, Dear. After being kidnapped in a limo by the main characters, the group performs "Bless the Broken Road" for them as an anniversary gift.

The group appears as themselves in Hannah Montana: The Movie singing their song "Backwards" during the scene of Miley's grandma's birthday party, and then "Bless the Broken Road" in an evening scene on the front porch. They appeared as themselves, promoting Jamie Oliver's Food Revolution in Huntington, West Virginia.

The group appears as themselves on CSI (season 10 episode 14), in which they perform in concert. In the episode entitled "Unshockable", DeMarcus is electrocuted by what turned out to be their bass tech Travis Murray. On the commentary they said what a great opportunity it was to work with such fine actors who are so good at what they do, LeVox stated, "It's one of my favorite shows and it was an honor to add a little piece of Rascal Flatts to the episode."

They also appeared in a 2009 Hershey Chocolate commercial.

On April 28, 2010, Rascal Flatts appeared as themselves on American Idol. They also sang with Shakira.

They recorded a live concert during the January 20, 2011 show in St. Paul, Minnesota, that was broadcast on ABC, March 12, 2011.

On April 17, 2011, the group appeared as themselves on West Coast Customs. West Coast Customs builds them a custom Chevrolet Camaro inspired by their song, "Red Camaro" They also performed the theme song for the show.

On May 23, 2011, Rascal Flatts performed on 'Surprise, Oprah! A Farewell Spectacular Part 1' along with other artists including Josh Groban, Patti LaBelle, and Beyoncé.

On April 5, 2012, Rascal Flatts appeared on the television special Changed: One Night Exclusive Theater Event. The special in-theater concert hit movie screens nationwide for one night only. It included live performance footage, Q&A sessions, and welcome messages from the band. The event showcased many tracks from the upcoming studio album.

References

External links 

 

1999 establishments in Ohio
2021 disestablishments in Ohio
American country music groups
American musical trios
Big Machine Records artists
Country pop groups
Grand Ole Opry members
Lyric Street Records artists
Musical groups established in 1999
Musical groups disestablished in 2021
Musical groups from Columbus, Ohio
Vocal trios